Gravel Run may refer to:

Gravel Run (French Creek tributary), in Crawford County, Pennsylvania
Gravel Run (Black Creek), in Luzerne County, Pennsylvania
Gravel Run, Michigan, a historic settlement
Gravel Run (Susquehanna River), in Northumberland County, Pennsylvania